"Solang es Menschen gibt auf Erden" (As long as there are people on Earth) is a Christian hymn with German text by Dieter Trautwein, translating a 1969 Dutch hymn by Huub Oosterhuis. The song, of the genre Neues Geistliches Lied (NGL), is part of German hymnals and songbooks.

History 
Oosterhuis wrote the text in Dutch, "Zolang er mensen zijn op aarde" in 1959, when he was a priest for students. The melody was composed by Tera de Marez Oyens the same year. Dieter Trautwein's translation from 1966, revised in 1972, was included in the German Catholic hymnal  Gotteslob as GL 425, in the section "Leben in Gott - Vertrauen und Trost" (Life in God – trust and consolation). It was also printed in the Protestant hymnal of 1995 Evangelisches Gesangbuch, as EG 427. The song is part of many songbooks.

Text, theme and music 
The text is in five stanzas of four lines each which rhyme in Dutch, but not in the translation. It begins with thanks to God, who is addressed as a personal "du" (You), for having given life to people and fruits. It alludes to the promise from : "While the earth remaineth, seedtime and harvest, and cold and heat, and summer and winter, and day and night shall not cease." God has nourished birds and made flowers beautiful, as the third stanza says. The second stanza reminds of God's word calling for peace ("solang dein Wort zum Frieden ruft"). The fourth stanza addresses God as Light and giver of life, with his Son the bread uniting the believers. The final stanza calls all who owe their life to God to stay in communication.

The melody has been described as simple (schlicht), with a forward-moving steady rhythm. All four short lines are similar. Its irregular dancing beat has been compared to a tango.

The song has been used in the context of preservation of natural environment and peace movement, because the "solang" (as long), often repeated in the text, is a reminder that the state of both the environment and peace are fragile.

References

External links 
 

Contemporary Christian songs
1973 songs
Neues Geistliches Lied